Ayrton Senna was a Brazilian racing driver who won three Formula One world championships. He entered Formula One in 1984 with the Toleman team, but after one season, he moved to Lotus. He spent three seasons with Lotus before moving to McLaren in 1988. Over the next five years, the intense rivalry between Senna and Alain Prost, a leading Formula One driver, came to the forefront, with particularly notable race incidents and collisions occurring between the two. Senna won all three of his world championships during his six seasons with McLaren, in 1988, 1990 and 1991. He wanted to move to Williams after 1992, but was prevented from doing so by a clause in Alain Prost's contract. He moved to Williams in 1994, but during the third race of the season, he was killed in an accident while leading the 1994 San Marino Grand Prix. He was among the most dominant and successful Formula One drivers of the modern era, and is considered by some as the greatest racing driver of all time.

Senna achieved his first victory in Formula One at the 1985 Portuguese Grand Prix on 21 April. John Blunsden of The Times described the win as "one of the most telling examples of supreme driving ability", while fellow driver Patrick Tambay described the race as a nightmare, as it was "very, very flooded everywhere, the cloud ceiling very low and the light very poor". He won two races in each of his three years with Lotus before moving to McLaren for the 1988 season. He secured his first Formula One world championship that year and enjoyed his most successful season in terms of race wins. His eight victories that year set a new record for the most wins in a season, breaking the previous record of seven by Jim Clark. In the subsequent three seasons with McLaren, he won six or more races each season, securing two more Formula One world championship titles in 1990 and 1991. Senna managed only three victories in 1992. In all, Senna won 41 Grands Prix at seventeen different circuits.

By winning 41 races from 161 Grand Prix starts, Senna is currently ranked fifth overall in the all-time Formula One Grand Prix winners' list. 35 of his victories were for McLaren, and 32 of his wins were in cars with a Honda engine. Of his remaining nine victories, five were achieved with Ford powered cars, and four with Renault. He was most successful at Monaco, where he won six times during his career, including a record five consecutive times between 1989 and 1993. His largest margin of victory was 1:23.199 at the 1993 European Grand Prix, while the narrowest margin was at the 1986 Spanish Grand Prix, when he beat Nigel Mansell by 0.014 seconds, one of the closest finishes in Formula One.

Wins
Key:
 No. – Victory number; for example, "1" signifies Senna's first race win.
 Race – Race number; for example, "1" signifies the first race Senna took part in. Races in which Senna unsuccessfully attempted to qualify are included.
 Grid – The position on the grid at which Senna started the race.
 Margin – Margin of victory, given in the format of minutes:seconds.milliseconds
  – Driver's Championship winning season.

Number of wins at different Grands Prix

Number of wins at different circuits

See also
 List of Formula One Grand Prix winners

References

External links 
 Drivers: Hall of Fame: Ayrton Senna
 Ayrton Senna: Involvement from Stats F1

Ayrton Senna
1980s in motorsport
1980s-related lists
1990s in motorsport
1990s-related lists
Senna